Emre Öztürk (born 1 April 1986) is a Turkish-German former professional footballer who played as a right winger.

References

External links 
 
 
 

1986 births
Living people
Turkish footballers
German people of Turkish descent
German footballers
VfL Wolfsburg players
VfL Wolfsburg II players
SV Sandhausen players
SV Waldhof Mannheim players
Göztepe S.K. footballers
Yeni Malatyaspor footballers
Fethiyespor footballers
Kahramanmaraşspor footballers
3. Liga players
TFF First League players
TFF Second League players
Association football forwards
Sportspeople from Heidelberg
Footballers from Baden-Württemberg